Legislative elections were held in French Polynesia on 16 March 1986 for the Territorial Assembly. The result was a victory for Tahoera'a Huiraatira, which won 22 of the 41 seats. Its leader Gaston Flosse remained President of the Government.

Background
Elections had been due to be held in 1987. However, in 1985 the government and opposition ask the French Council of Ministers for early elections be held. The request was approved and the Assembly elected in 1982 was dissolved on 23 December. Prior to its dissolution, the Assembly adopted an amended electoral law increasing the number of seats from 30 to 41 and introducing an electoral threshold of 5%. Lists were also required to have two more candidates than the number of seats in the constituency to provide replacements and avoid the need for by-elections.

Results
The initial results showed Tahoera'a Huiraatira winning 21 seats. However, after a recount in the Leeward Islands, they were awarded another seat.

Aftermath
Following the elections, two members of the minor parties joined Tahoera'a Huiraatira, giving them 24 of the 41 seats. Gaston Flosse was subsequently elected president by a vote of 25 to 2. In addition to Flosse, four other Assembly members became ministers; Georges Kelly, Alexandre Léontieff, Jacques Teheiura and Michel Buillard. They were replaced in the Assembly by Franklin Brotherson, Roger Doom, Albert Taruoura. Emma Tetuanui and Lionel Watanabe.

References

French
1986 in French Polynesia
Elections in French Polynesia
March 1986 events in Oceania
Election and referendum articles with incomplete results